Goolwa may also refer to:

Goolwa, South Australia, a town and locality

Goolwa Airport, an airport in South Australia
Goolwa Barrages, a series of  tidal barrages in the River Murray in  South Australia
Goolwa cockle, a  common name for the mollusc, Plebidonax deltoides
Hundred of Goolwa, a cadastral unit in South Australia

See also
Goolwa Beach, South Australia
Goolwa North, South Australia
Goolwa South, South Australia